"Most Girls" is a song recorded by American singer Hailee Steinfeld. It was released on April 28, 2017 by Republic Records. Steinfeld wrote the "female empowerment anthem" with Jeremy Dussolliet, Tim Sommers, Asia Whiteacre, and the record's co-producers, Ryan Tedder and Zach Skelton.

Background and release
On April 24, Steinfeld revealed the cover and release date for "Most Girls" through her social media pages. The song is Steinfeld's first single as a lead artist since "Starving" in July 2016, following a number of collaborations released earlier in 2017. "Most Girls" was released to digital retailers worldwide on April 28, 2017. While it was made available for airplay immediately, its official impact date at American contemporary hit radio was May 2, 2017. Republic Records also serviced the song to hot adult contemporary stations on May 15, 2017.

Critical reception
Jonathan Currinn of Outlet Mag wrote that the song's lyrics "are incredibly clever, really proving that Hailee Steinfeld has what it takes to inspire women," and also praised the "rhythmically groovy" but not over-produced beat. De Elizabeth of Teen Vogue called Steinfeld's vocals on the track "catchy," and wrote that "you'll want to be listening to this jam all weekend." Mike Wass of Idolator wrote that "Most Girls" is "as catchy as it is relatable and inspiring."

Live performances
Steinfeld performed "Most Girls" live for the first time at 2017 Radio Disney Music Awards on April 29, 2017.

Music video
The official music video for "Most Girls" was directed by Hannah Lux Davis and premiered May 23, 2017. The clip begins with Steinfeld rebuffing a man who claims she is "not like most girls". Throughout the majority of the video, Steinfeld "channels" various different personas, including a boxer, party girl, and a bookworm. Arielle Tschinkel of Idolator wrote that the video's premise emphasizes "that girls can be whoever they want to be". At the end of the video, Steinfeld is joined by a group of young women wearing T-shirts emblazoned with positive attributes such as "fearless" and "relentless".

While the video received praise for its message of embracing individuality, it also drew some criticism for its lack of diversity. "All of these girls are extremely thin and femme," writes Aimée Lutkin of The Muse-Jezebel, "so in reality most girls do not appear in this video."

Charts

Weekly charts

Year-end charts

Certifications

Release history

References

2017 songs
2017 singles
Hailee Steinfeld songs
Republic Records singles
Songs with feminist themes
Songs written by Ryan Tedder
Song recordings produced by Ryan Tedder
Music videos directed by Hannah Lux Davis
Electropop songs
Songs written by One Love (record producer)
Songs written by Kinetics (rapper)
Songs written by Zach Skelton
Songs written by Asia Whiteacre
Songs written by Hailee Steinfeld